The 2004 NAIA Football Championship Series concluded on December 18, 2004 with the championship game played at Jim Carroll Stadium in Savannah, Tennessee.  The game was won by the Carroll Fighting Saints over the Saint Francis Cougars by a score of 15–13.

Tournament bracket

References

 
NAIA Football National Championship
Carroll Fighting Saints football
Saint Francis Cougars football
NAIA Football National Championship
NAIA football